Yoann Huget (born 2 June 1987) is a former French rugby union player. He played as a wing or fullback.

Career

Club
He started his rugby career playing for Stade Toulousain in the 2005–06 Top 14 season. He scored his first try in November 2006 against CA Brive. He joined SU Agen in the 2008–09 Rugby Pro D2 competition. He scored 14 tries for Agen in that season and was the top try-scorer of the season. He played a few more games the following season before signing up with the Top 14 side, Bayonne. He returned to Stade Toulousain at the beginning of the 2012–13 Top 14 season.

International
After having an impressive start in the 2010–11 Top 14 season, he was selected into the France national rugby team for the 2010 end of year rugby tests. He made his international debut for France on 20 November 2010 against Argentina on the right wing. He was initially selected in France's provisional squad for the 2011 Rugby World Cup but had to withdraw after missing a number of doping tests. He was selected for the 2015 Rugby World Cup but picked up a cruciate ligament injury in the first game against Italy and was replaced in the squad by Rémy Grosso.

International

International tries

Honours

Club 
 Toulouse
Top 14 (2): 2007–08, 2018–19

References

External links
 Player Profile in lequipe.fr
 Profile
 Itsrugby profile
 English rugby cup profile

1987 births
French rugby union players
Living people
People from Pamiers
Rugby union fullbacks
Rugby union wings
France international rugby union players
Stade Toulousain players
Sportspeople from Ariège (department)